Elections to Rochdale Council were held on 1 May 2003.  One third of the council was up for election and the Labour Party lost overall control of the council to no overall control.

After the election, the composition of the council was:
Labour: 30;
Liberal Democrat: 22; and
Conservative: 8.

Election result

Ward results

External links
BBC report of 2003 Rochdale election result

2003 English local elections
2003
2000s in Greater Manchester